The 60th Annual Grammy Awards ceremony was held on January 28, 2018. The CBS network broadcast the show live from Madison Square Garden in New York City. The show was moved to January to avoid coinciding with the 2018 Winter Olympics in Pyeongchang, as was the case in 2010 and 2014. James Corden returned as host.

The ceremony recognizes the best recordings, compositions and artists of the eligibility year, which ran from October 1, 2016, to September 30, 2017. The nominations were announced on November 28, 2017. The "pre-telecast" ceremony (officially named The Premiere Ceremony) was held on the same day prior to the main ceremony.

Bruno Mars was nominated for six awards and won all six on the night.

Performers

Premiere ceremony

Main ceremony

Presenters

John Legend and Tony Bennett – presented Best Rap/Sung Performance
Kelly Clarkson and Nick Jonas – presented Best New Artist
Jim Gaffigan – introduced Little Big Town
Jon Batiste, Gary Clark Jr., and Joe Saylor – presented Best Pop Solo Performance
Sarah Silverman and Victor Cruz – introduced Luis Fonsi, Daddy Yankee and Zuleyka Rivera
Dave Chappelle – presented Best Rap Album
Katie Holmes – introduced Bruno Mars and Cardi B
Trevor Noah – presenting Best Comedy Album
Donnie Wahlberg and Hailee Steinfeld – presenting Best Country Album
Janelle Monáe – introduced Kesha, Camila Cabello, Cyndi Lauper, Julia Michaels, Andra Day and Bebe Rexha
Camila Cabello – introduced U2
Sting – presenting Song of the Year
Anna Kendrick – introduced Elton John and Miley Cyrus
Shemar Moore and Eve – introduced SZA
Alicia Keys – presenting Record of the Year
U2 – presenting Album of the Year

Nominations and winners
Nominees list adapted from the Recording Academy's website.

General
Record of the Year

"24K Magic" – Bruno Mars
Shampoo Press & Curl, producers; Serban Ghenea, John Hanes & Charles Moniz, engineers/mixers; Tom Coyne, mastering engineer
"Redbone" – Childish Gambino
Donald Glover & Ludwig Goransson, producers; Donald Glover, Ludwig Goransson, Riley Mackin & Ruben Rivera, engineers/mixers; Bernie Grundman, mastering engineer
 "Despacito" – Luis Fonsi and Daddy Yankee featuring Justin Bieber
 Josh Gudwin, Mauricio Rengifo & Andrés Torres, producers; Josh Gudwin & Jaycen Joshua, Chris "TEK" O’Ryan, Mauricio Rengifo, Juan G Rivera "Gaby Music", Luis "Salda" Saldarriaga & Andrés Torres,  engineers/mixers; Dave Kutch, mastering engineer
 "The Story of O.J." – Jay-Z
 Jay-Z & No I.D., producers; Jimmy Douglass & Gimel "Young Guru" Keaton, engineers/mixers; Dave Kutch, mastering engineer
 "Humble" – Kendrick Lamar
 Asheton Hogan & Mike Will Made It, producers; Derek "MixedByAli" Ali, James Hunt & Matt Schaeffer, engineers/mixers; Mike Bozzi, mastering engineer

Album of the Year

 24K Magic – Bruno Mars 
 Shampoo Press & Curl, producers; Serban Ghenea, John Hanes & Charles Moniz, engineers/mixers; Christopher Brody Brown, James Fauntleroy, Philip Lawrence & Bruno Mars, songwriters; Tom Coyne, mastering engineer "Awaken, My Love!" – Childish Gambino
 Donald Glover & Ludwig Goransson, producers; Bryan Carrigan, Chris Fogel, Donald Glover, Ludwig Goransson, Riley Mackin & Ruben Rivera, engineers/mixers; Donald Glover & Ludwig Goransson, songwriters; Bernie Grundman, mastering engineer
 4:44 – Jay-Z
 Jay-Z & No I.D., producers; Jimmy Douglass & Gimel "Young Guru" Keaton, engineers/mixers; Shawn Carter & Dion Wilson, songwriters; Dave Kutch, mastering engineer
 Damn – Kendrick Lamar
 DJ Dahi, Sounwave & Anthony Tiffith, producers; Derek "MixedByAli" Ali, James Hunt & Matt Schaeffer, engineers/mixers; K. Duckworth, D. Natche, M. Spears & A. Tiffith, songwriters; Mike Bozzi, mastering engineer
 Melodrama – Lorde
Jack Antonoff & Lorde, producers; Serban Ghenea, John Hanes & Laura Sisk, engineers/mixers; Jack Antonoff & Ella Yelich-O'Connor, songwriters; Randy Merrill, mastering engineer

Song of the Year

"That's What I Like"Christopher Brody Brown, James Fauntleroy, Philip Lawrence, Bruno Mars, Ray Charles McCullough II, Jeremy Reeves, Ray Romulus & Jonathan Yip, songwriters (Bruno Mars) "Despacito"
 Ramón Ayala Rodriguez, Justin Bieber, Jason Boyd, Erika Ender, Luis Fonsi & Marty James Garton Jr., songwriters (Luis Fonsi & Daddy Yankee featuring Justin Bieber)
 "4:44"
 Shawn Carter & Dion Wilson, songwriters (Jay-Z)
 "Issues"
Benjamin Levin, Mikkel Storleer Eriksen, Tor Erik Hermansen, Julia Michaels & Justin Drew Tranter, songwriters (Julia Michaels)
"1-800-273-8255"
Alessia Caracciolo, Sir Robert Bryson Hall II, Arjun Ivatury, Khalid Robinson & Andrew Taggart, songwriters (Logic featuring Alessia Cara & Khalid)

Best New ArtistAlessia CaraKhalid
Lil Uzi Vert
Julia Michaels
SZA

Pop
Best Pop Solo Performance"Shape of You" – Ed Sheeran "Love So Soft" – Kelly Clarkson
 "Praying" – Kesha
 "Million Reasons" – Lady Gaga
 "What About Us" – Pink

Best Pop Duo/Group Performance
 "Feel It Still" – Portugal. The Man "Something Just like This" – The Chainsmokers and Coldplay
 "Despacito" – Luis Fonsi and Daddy Yankee featuring Justin Bieber
 "Thunder" – Imagine Dragons
 "Stay" – Zedd and Alessia Cara

Best Traditional Pop Vocal Album
 Tony Bennett Celebrates 90 – Dae Bennett, producer (various artists) Nobody but Me (deluxe version) – Michael Bublé
 Triplicate – Bob Dylan
 In Full Swing – Seth MacFarlane
 Wonderland – Sarah McLachlan

Best Pop Vocal Album÷ – Ed Sheeran Kaleidoscope EP – Coldplay
Lust for Life – Lana Del Rey
 Evolve – Imagine Dragons
 Rainbow – Kesha
 Joanne – Lady Gaga

 Dance/Electronic Music Best Dance Recording "Tonite" – LCD Soundsystem James Murphy, producer; James Murphy, mixer "Bambro Koyo Ganda" – Bonobo featuring Innov Gnawa
 Bonobo, producer; Bonobo, mixer
 "Cola" – CamelPhat & Elderbrook
 CamelPhat & Elderbrook, producers; CamelPhat, mixer
 "Andromeda" – Gorillaz featuring DRAM
 Damon Albarn, Jamie Hewlett, Remi Kabaka & Anthony Khan, producers; Stephen Sedgwick, mixer
 "Line of Sight" – Odesza featuring WYNNE & Mansionair
 Clayton Knight & Harrison Mills, producers; Eric J Dubowsky, mixerBest Dance/Electronic Album 3-D The Catalogue – Kraftwerk Migration – Bonobo
 Mura Masa – Mura Masa
 A Moment Apart – Odesza
 What Now – Sylvan Esso

 Contemporary Instrumental Music Best Contemporary Instrumental Album Prototype – Jeff Lorber Fusion What If – The Jerry Douglas Band
 Spirit – Alex Han
 Mount Royal – Julian Lage and Chris Eldridge
 Bad Hombre – Antonio Sanchez

Rock
Best Rock Performance
 "You Want It Darker" – Leonard Cohen "The Promise" – Chris Cornell
 "Run" – Foo Fighters
 "No Good" – Kaleo
 "Go to War" – Nothing More

Best Metal Performance
 "Sultan's Curse" – Mastodon "Invisible Enemy" – August Burns Red
 "Black Hoodie" – Body Count
 "Forever" – Code Orange
 "Clockworks" – Meshuggah

Best Rock Song
 "Run" Foo Fighters, songwriters (Foo Fighters) "Atlas, Rise!"
 James Hetfield and Lars Ulrich, songwriters (Metallica)
 "Blood in the Cut"
 JT Daly and Kristine Flaherty, songwriters (K.Flay)
 "Go to War"
 Ben Anderson, Jonny Hawkins, Will Hoffman, Daniel Oliver, David Pramik & Mark Vollelunga, songwriters (Nothing More)
 "The Stage"
 Zachary Baker, Brian Haner, Matthew Sanders, Jonathan Seward & Brooks Wackerman, songwriters (Avenged Sevenfold)

Best Rock Album
 A Deeper Understanding – The War on Drugs Emperor of Sand – Mastodon
 Hardwired... to Self-Destruct – Metallica
 The Stories We Tell Ourselves – Nothing More
 Villains – Queens of the Stone Age

 Alternative Best Alternative Music Album Sleep Well Beast – The National Everything Now – Arcade Fire
 Humanz – Gorillaz
 American Dream – LCD Soundsystem
 Pure Comedy – Father John Misty

 R&B Best R&B Performance"That's What I Like" – Bruno Mars "Get You" – Daniel Caesar featuring Kali Uchis
 "Distraction" – Kehlani
 "High" – Ledisi
 "The Weekend" – SZABest Traditional R&B Performance "Redbone" – Childish Gambino "Laugh and Move On" – The Baylor Project
 "What I'm Feelin'" – Anthony Hamilton featuring The Hamiltones
 "All the Way" – Ledisi
 "Still" – Mali MusicBest R&B Song"That's What I Like"Christopher Brody Brown, James Fauntleroy, Philip Lawrence, Bruno Mars, Ray Charles McCullough II, Jeremy Reeves, Ray Romulus & Jonathan Yip, songwriters (Bruno Mars) "First Began"
 PJ Morton, songwriter (PJ Morton)
 "Location"
 Alfredo Gonzalez, Olatunji Ige, Samuel David Jiminez, Christopher McClenney, Khalid Robinson & Joshua Scruggs, songwriters (Khalid)
 "Redbone"
 Donald Glover & Ludwig Goransson, songwriters (Childish Gambino)
 "Supermodel"
 Tyran Donaldson, Terrence Henderson, Greg Landfair Jr.,  Carter Lang & Solana Rowe, songwriters (SZA)Best Urban Contemporary AlbumStarboy – The Weeknd Free 6lack – 6lack
 "Awaken, My Love!" – Childish Gambino
 American Teen – Khalid
Ctrl – SZABest R&B Album 24K Magic – Bruno Mars Freudian – Daniel Caesar
 Let Love Rule – Ledisi
 Gumbo – PJ Morton
 Feel the Real – Musiq Soulchild

 Rap 
Best Rap Performance
 "Humble" – Kendrick Lamar "Bounce Back" – Big Sean
 "Bodak Yellow" – Cardi B
 "4:44" – Jay-Z
 "Bad and Boujee" – Migos featuring Lil Uzi Vert

Best Rap/Sung Performance
 "Loyalty" – Kendrick Lamar featuring Rihanna "Prblms" – 6lack
 "Crew" – GoldLink featuring Brent Faiyaz & Shy Glizzy
 "Family Feud" – Jay-Z featuring Beyoncé
 "Love Galore" – SZA featuring Travis ScottBest Rap Song "Humble" K. Duckworth, Asheton Hogan & M. Williams II, songwriters (Kendrick Lamar) "Bodak Yellow"
 Belcalis Almanzar, Dieuson Octave, Klenord Raphael, Shaftizm, Jordan Thorpe & J White, songwriters (Cardi B)
 "Chase Me"
 Judah Bauer, Brian Burton, Hector Delgado, Jaime Meline, Antwan Patton, Michael Render, Russell Simins & Jon Spencer, songwriters (Danger Mouse featuring Run The Jewels & Big Boi)
 "Sassy"
 Marlanna Evans, E. Gabouer, Jason Martin & Wyann Vaughn, songwriters (Rapsody)
 "The Story of O.J."
 Shawn Carter & Dion Wilson, songwriters (Jay-Z)Best Rap Album Damn – Kendrick Lamar 4:44 – Jay-Z
 Culture – Migos
 Laila's Wisdom – Rapsody
 Flower Boy – Tyler, the Creator

 Country Best Country Solo Performance "Either Way" – Chris Stapleton "Body Like a Back Road" – Sam Hunt
 "Losing You" – Alison Krauss
 "Tin Man" – Miranda Lambert
 "I Could Use a Love Song" – Maren MorrisBest Country Duo/Group Performance "Better Man" – Little Big Town "It Ain't My Fault" – Brothers Osborne
 "My Old Man" – Zac Brown Band
 "You Look Good" – Lady Antebellum
 "Drinkin' Problem" – MidlandBest Country Song "Broken Halos" Mike Henderson & Chris Stapleton, songwriters (Chris Stapleton) "Better Man"
 Taylor Swift, songwriter (Little Big Town)
 "Body Like a Back Road"
 Zach Crowell, Sam Hunt, Shane McAnally & Josh Osborne, songwriters (Sam Hunt)
 "Drinkin' Problem"
 Jess Carson, Cameron Duddy, Shane McAnally, Josh Osborne & Mark Wystrach, songwriters (Midland)
 "Tin Man"
 Jack Ingram, Miranda Lambert & Jon Randall, songwriters (Miranda Lambert)Best Country Album From A Room: Volume 1 – Chris Stapleton Cosmic Hallelujah – Kenny Chesney
 Heart Break – Lady Antebellum
 The Breaker – Little Big Town
 Life Changes – Thomas Rhett

 New Age Best New Age Album Dancing on Water – Peter Kater Reflection – Brian Eno
 SongVersation: Medicine – India Arie
 Sacred Journey of Ku-Kai, Volume 5 – Kitarō
 Spiral Revelation – Steve Roach

 Jazz Best Improvised Jazz Solo "Miles Beyond" – John McLaughlin, soloist "Can't Remember Why" – Sara Caswell, soloist
 "Dance of Shiva" – Billy Childs, soloist
 "Whisper Not" – Fred Hersch, soloist
 "Ilimba" – Chris Potter, soloistBest Jazz Vocal Album Dreams and Daggers – Cécile McLorin Salvant The Journey – The Baylor Project
 A Social Call – Jazzmeia Horn
 Bad Ass and Blind – Raul Midón
 Porter Plays Porter – Randy Porter Trio with Nancy KingBest Jazz Instrumental Album Rebirth – Billy Childs Uptown, Downtown – Bill Charlap Trio
 Project Freedom – Joey DeFrancesco & The People
 Open Book – Fred Hersch
 The Dreamer Is the Dream – Chris PotterBest Large Jazz Ensemble Album Bringin' It – Christian McBride Big Band MONK'estra Vol. 2 – John Beasley
 Jigsaw – Alan Ferber Big Band
 Homecoming – Vince Mendoza & WDR Big Band Cologne
 Whispers on the Wind – Chuck Owen and the Jazz SurgeBest Latin Jazz Album Jazz Tango – Pablo Ziegler Trio Hybrido – From Rio to Wayne Shorter – Antonio Adolfo
 Oddara – Jane Bunnett & Maqueque
 Outra Coisa – The Music of Moacir Santos – Anat Cohen & Marcello Gonçalves
 Típico – Miguel Zenón

 Gospel/Contemporary Christian Music Best Gospel Performance/Song "Never Have to Be Alone" – CeCe Winans Dwan Hill & Alvin Love III, songwriters "Too Hard Not To" – Tina Campbell
 Tina Campbell & Warryn Campbell, songwriters
 "You Deserve It" – JJ Hairston & Youthful Praise featuring Bishop Cortez Vaughn
 David Bloom, JJ Hairston, Phontane Demond Reed & Cortez Vaughn, songwriters
 "Better Days" – Le'Andria
 Le'Andria, songwriter
 "My Life" – The Walls Group
 Warryn Campbell, Eric Dawkins, Damien Farmer, Damon Thomas, Ahjah Walls & Darrel Walls, songwritersBest Contemporary Christian Music Performance/Song "What a Beautiful Name" – Hillsong Worship Ben Fielding & Brooke Ligertwood, songwriters "Oh My Soul" – Casting Crowns
 Mark Hall, Bernie Herms & Nichole Nordeman, songwriters
 "Clean" – Natalie Grant
 Natalie Grant, songwriter
 "Even If" – MercyMe
 David Garcia, Ben Glover, Crystal Lewis, MercyMe & Tim Timmons, songwriters
 "Hills and Valleys" – Tauren Wells
 Chuck Butler, Jonathan Smith & Tauren Wells, songwritersBest Gospel Album Let Them Fall in Love – CeCe Winans Crossover: Live from Music City – Travis Greene
 Bigger Than Me – Le'Andria Johnson
 Close – Marvin Sapp
 Sunday Song – Anita WilsonBest Contemporary Christian Music Album Chain Breaker – Zach Williams Rise – Danny Gokey
 Echoes (deluxe edition) – Matt Maher
 Lifer – MercyMe
 Hills and Valleys – Tauren WellsBest Roots Gospel Album Sing It Now: Songs of Faith & Hope – Reba McEntire The Best of The Collingsworth Family – Volume 1 – The Collingsworth Family
 Give Me Jesus – Larry Cordle
 Resurrection – Joseph Habedank
 Hope for All Nations – Karen Peck & New River

Latin
Best Latin Pop Album
 El Dorado – Shakira Lo Único Constante – Alex Cuba
 Mis Planes Son Amarte – Juanes
 Amar y Vivir (En Vivo Desde la Ciudad de México, 2017) – La Santa Cecilia
 Musas (Un Homenaje al Folclore Latinoamericano en Manos de Los Macorinos) – Natalia Lafourcade

Best Latin Rock, Urban or Alternative Album
 Residente – Residente Ayo – Bomba Estéreo
 Pa' Fuera – C4 Trío & Desorden Público
 Salvavidas de Hielo – Jorge Drexler
 El Paradise – Los Amigos Invisibles

Best Regional Mexican Music Album (Including Tejano)
 Arrieros Somos – Sesiones Acústicas – Aida Cuevas Ni Diablo, ni Santo – Julión Álvarez y Su Norteño Banda
 Ayer y Hoy – Banda el Recodo de Cruz Lizárraga
 Momentos – Alex Campos
 Zapateando en el Norte – (various artists)

Best Tropical Latin Album
 Salsa Big Band – Rubén Blades con Roberto Delgado & Orquesta Albita – Albita
 Art of the Arrangement – Doug Beavers
 Gente Valiente – Silvestre Dangond
 Indestructible – Diego el Cigala

American Roots
Best American Roots Performance
 "Killer Diller Blues" – Alabama Shakes "Let My Mother Live" – Blind Boys of Alabama
 "Arkansas Farmboy" – Glen Campbell
 "Steer Your Way" – Leonard Cohen
 "I Never Cared for You" – Alison Krauss

Best American Roots Song
 "If We Were Vampires" Jason Isbell, songwriter (Jason Isbell and the 400 Unit) "Cumberland Gap"
 David Rawlings & Gillian Welch, songwriters (David Rawlings)
 "I Wish You Well"
 Raul Malo & Alan Miller, songwriters (The Mavericks)
 "It Ain't Over Yet"
 Rodney Crowell, songwriter (Rodney Crowell featuring Rosanne Cash & John Paul White)
 "My Only True Friend"
 Gregg Allman & Scott Sharrard, songwriters (Gregg Allman)

Best Americana Album
 The Nashville Sound – Jason Isbell and the 400 Unit Southern Blood – Gregg Allman
 Shine on Rainy Day – Brent Cobb
 Beast Epic – Iron & Wine
 Brand New Day – The Mavericks

Best Bluegrass Album
 Laws of Gravity – Infamous Stringdusters All the Rage: In Concert Volume One [Live] – Rhonda Vincent and the Rage Fiddler's Dream – Michael Cleveland
 Original – Bobby Osborne
 Universal Favorite – Noam Pikelny

Best Traditional Blues Album
 Blue & Lonesome – The Rolling Stones Migration Blues – Eric Bibb
 Elvin Bishop's Big Fun Trio – Elvin Bishop's Big Fun Trio
 Roll and Tumble – R.L. Boyce
 Sonny & Brownie's Last Train – Guy Davis & Fabrizio Poggi

Best Contemporary Blues Album
 TajMo – Taj Mahal & Keb' Mo' Robert Cray & Hi Rhythm – Robert Cray & Hi Rhythm
 Recorded Live in Lafayette – Sonny Landreth
 Got Soul – Robert Randolph and the Family Band
 Live from the Fox Oakland – Tedeschi Trucks Band

Best Folk Album
 Mental Illness – Aimee Mann Semper Femina – Laura Marling
 The Queen of Hearts – Offa Rex (Olivia Chaney + The Decemberists)
 You Don't Own Me Anymore – The Secret Sisters
 The Laughing Apple – Yusuf / Cat Stevens

Best Regional Music Album
 Kalenda – The Lost Bayou Ramblers Top of the Mountain – Dwayne Dopsie and the Zydeco Hellraisers
 Ho'okena 3.0 – Ho'okena
 Miyo Kekisepa, Make a Stand [Live] – Northern Cree
 Pua Kiele – Josh Tatofi

Reggae
Best Reggae Album
 Stony Hill – Damian "Jr. Gong" Marley Chronology – Chronixx
 Lost in Paradise – Common Kings
 Wash House Ting – J Boog
 Avrakedabra – Morgan Heritage

World Music
Best World Music Album
 Shaka Zulu Revisited: 30th Anniversary Celebration – Ladysmith Black Mambazo Memoria de los Sentidos – Vicente Amigo
 Para Mí – Concha Buika
 Rosa dos Ventos – Anat Cohen & Trio Brasileiro
 Elwan – Tinariwen

Children
Best Children's Album
 Feel What U Feel – Lisa Loeb Brighter Side – Gustafer Yellowgold
 Lemonade – Justin Roberts
 Rise Shine #Woke – Alphabet Rockers
 Songs of Peace & Love for Kids & Parents Around the World – Ladysmith Black Mambazo

Spoken Word
Best Spoken Word Album (includes Poetry, Audio Books and Storytelling)
 The Princess Diarist – Carrie Fisher (posthumous) Astrophysics for People in a Hurry – Neil deGrasse Tyson
 Born to Run – Bruce Springsteen
 Confessions of a Serial Songwriter – Shelly Peiken
 Our Revolution: A Future to Believe In – Bernie Sanders and Mark Ruffalo

Comedy
Best Comedy Album
  The Age of Spin & Deep in the Heart of Texas – Dave Chappelle Cinco – Jim Gaffigan
 Jerry Before Seinfeld – Jerry Seinfeld
 A Speck of Dust – Sarah Silverman
 What Now? – Kevin Hart

Musical Theatre
 Best Musical Theater AlbumDear Evan Hansen – Laura Dreyfuss, Mike Faist, Rachel Bay Jones, Kristolyn Lloyd, Michael Park, Ben Platt, Will Roland & Jennifer Laura Thompson, principal soloists; Pete Ganbarg, Alex Lacamoire, Stacey Mindich, Benj Pasek & Justin Paul, producers; Benj Pasek & Justin Paul, composers/lyricists (Original Broadway Cast Recording)Come from Away –  Ian Eisendrath, August Eriksmoen, David Hein, David Lai & Irene Sankoff, producers; David Hein & Irene Sankoff, composers/lyricists (Original Broadway Cast Recording)
Hello, Dolly! – Bette Midler, principal soloist; Steven Epstein, producer; (Jerry Herman, composer and lyricist) (New Broadway Cast Recording)

Music for Visual Media
 Best Compilation Soundtrack for Visual Media
 La La Land – (various artists) Marius de Vries & Justin Hurwitz, compilation producers Baby Driver – (various artists)
 Edgar Wright, compilation producer
 Guardians of the Galaxy Vol. 2: Awesome Mix Vol. 2 – (various artists)
 James Gunn, compilation producer
 Hidden Figures – (various artists)
 Pharrell Williams, compilation producer
 Moana – (various artists)
 Opetaia Foa'i, Tom MacDougall, Mark Mancina & Lin-Manuel Miranda, compilation producers

 Best Score Soundtrack for Visual Media
 La La Land – Justin Hurwitz, composer Arrival – Jóhann Jóhannsson, composer
 Dunkirk – Hans Zimmer, composer
 Game of Thrones: Season 7 – Ramin Djawadi, composer
 Hidden Figures – Benjamin Wallfisch, Pharrell Williams & Hans Zimmer, composers

 Best Song Written for Visual Media
 "How Far I'll Go" (from Moana) – Lin-Manuel Miranda, songwriter (Auliʻi Cravalho) "City of Stars" (from La La Land) – Justin Hurwitz, Benj Pasek & Justin Paul, songwriters (Ryan Gosling & Emma Stone)
 "I Don't Wanna Live Forever" (from Fifty Shades Darker) – Jack Antonoff, Sam Dew & Taylor Swift, songwriters (Zayn & Taylor Swift)
 "Never Give Up" (from Lion) – Sia Furler & Greg Kurstin, songwriters (Sia)
 "Stand Up for Something" (from Marshall) – Common, Andra Day & Diane Warren, songwriters (Andra Day featuring Common)

ComposingBest Instrumental Composition "Three Revolutions" Arturo O'Farrill, composer (Arturo O'Farrill & Chucho Valdés) "Alkaline"
 Pascal Le Boeuf, composer (Le Boeuf Brothers & JACK Quartet)
 "Choros #3"
 Vince Mendoza, composer (Vince Mendoza & WDR Big Band Cologne)
 "Warped Cowboy"
 Chuck Owen, composer (Chuck Owen and the Jazz Surge)
 "Home Free (For Peter Joe)"
 Nate Smith, composer (Nate Smith)

ArrangingBest Arrangement, Instrumental or A Cappella "Escapades for Alto Saxophone and Orchestra" from Catch Me If You Can
 John Williams, arranger (John Williams)
 "Ugly Beauty"/"Pannonica"
 John Beasley, arranger (John Beasley)
 "All Hat, No Saddle"
 Chuck Owen, arranger (Chuck Owen and the Jazz Surge)
 "Home Free (For Peter Joe)"
 Nate Smith, arranger (Nate Smith)
 "White Christmas"
 Chris Walden, arranger (Herb Alpert)

Best Arrangement, Instruments and Vocals
 "Putin"
 Randy Newman, arranger (Randy Newman)
 "I Loves You Porgy"/"There's a Boat That's Leavin' Soon for New York"
 Shelly Berg, Gregg Field, Gordon Goodwin & Clint Holmes, arrangers (Clint Holmes featuring Dee Dee Bridgewater and the Count Basie Orchestra)
 "Every Time We Say Goodbye"
 Jorge Calandrelli, arranger (Clint Holmes featuring Jane Monheit)
 "Another Day of Sun"
 Justin Hurwitz, arranger (La La Land cast)
 "I Like Myself"
 Joel McNeely, arranger (Seth MacFarlane)

Packaging
 Best Recording Package
 El Orisha de la Rosa
 Claudio Roncoli & Cactus Taller, art directors (Magín Díaz)
 Pure Comedy (Deluxe Edition)
 Sasha Barr, Ed Steed & Josh Tillman, art directors (Father John Misty)
 Mura Masa
 Alex Crossan & Matt de Jong, art directors (Mura Masa)
 Sleep Well Beast
 Elyanna Blaser-Gould, Luke Hayman & Andrea Trabucco-Campos, art directors (The National)
 Solid State
 Gail Marowitz, art director (Jonathan Coulton)

 Best Boxed or Special Limited Edition Package
 The Voyager Golden Record: 40th Anniversary Edition
 Lawrence Azerrad, Timothy Daly & David Pescovitz, art directors (Various Artists)
 Bobo Yeye: Belle Epoque In Upper Volta
 Tim Breen, art director (Various Artists)
 Lovely Creatures: The Best of Nick Cave and the Bad Seeds
 Tom Hingston, art director (Nick Cave and the Bad Seeds)
 May 1977: Get Shown the Light
 Masaki Koike, art director (Grateful Dead)
 Warfaring Strangers: Acid Nightmares
 Tim Breen, Benjamin Marra & Ken Shipley, art directors (Various Artists)

Notes
Best Album Notes
 Live at the Whisky a Go Go: The Complete Recordings
 Lynell George, album notes writer (Otis Redding)
 Arthur Q. Smith: The Trouble with the Truth
 Wayne Bledsoe & Bradley Reeves, album notes writers (Various Artists)
 Big Bend Killing: The Appalachian Ballad Tradition
 Ted Olson, album notes writer (Various Artists)
 The Complete Piano Works of Scott Joplin
 Bryan S. Wright, album notes writer (Richard Dowling)
 Edouard-Léon Scott De Martinville, Inventor of Sound Recording: A Bicentennial Tribute
 David Giovannoni, album notes writer (Various Artists)
 Washington Phillips and His Manzarene Dreams
 Michael Corcoran, album notes writer (Washington Phillips)

Historical
Best Historical Album
 Leonard Bernstein – The Composer
 Robert Russ, compilation producer; Martin Kistner & Andreas K. Meyer, mastering engineers (Leonard Bernstein)
 Bobo Yeye: Belle Epoque in Upper Volta
 Jon Kirby, Florent Mazzoleni, Rob Sevier & Ken Shipley, compilation producers; Jeff Lipton & Maria Rice, mastering engineers (Various Artists)
 Glenn Gould – The Goldberg Variations – The Complete Unreleased Recording Sessions June 1955
 Robert Russ, compilation producer; Matthias Erb, Martin Kistner & Andreas K. Meyer, mastering engineers (Glenn Gould)
 Sweet as Broken Dates: Lost Somali Tapes from the Horn of Africa
 Nicolas Sheikholeslami & Vik Sohonie, compilation producers; Michael Graves, mastering engineer (Various Artists)
 Washington Phillips and His Manzarene Dreams
 Michael Corcoran, April G. Ledbetter & Steven Lance Ledbetter, compilation producers; Michael Graves, mastering engineer (Washington Phillips)

Engineered Album
 Best Engineered Album, Non-Classical
 24K Magic
 Serban Ghenea, John Hanes & Charles Moniz, engineers; Tom Coyne, mastering engineer (Bruno Mars)
 Every Where Is Some Where
 Brent Arrowood, Miles Comaskey, JT Daly, Tommy English, Kristine Flaherty, Adam Hawkins, Chad Howat & Tony Maserati, engineers; Joe LaPorta, mastering engineer (K.Flay)
 Is This the Life We Really Want?
 Nigel Godrich, Sam Petts-Davies & Darrell Thorp, engineers; Bob Ludwig, mastering engineer (Roger Waters)
 Natural Conclusion
 Ryan Freeland, engineer; Joao Carvalho, mastering engineer (Rose Cousins)
 No Shape
 Shawn Everett & Joseph Lorge, engineers; Patricia Sullivan, mastering engineer (Perfume Genius)

 Best Engineered Album, Classical
 Shostakovich: Symphony No. 5; Barber: Adagio
Mark Donahue, engineer (Manfred Honeck & Pittsburgh Symphony Orchestra)
 Danielpour: Songs of Solitude & War Songs
Gary Call, engineer (Thomas Hampson, Giancarlo Guerrero & the Nashville Symphony)
 Kleiberg: Mass for Modern Man
Morten Lindberg, engineer (Eivind Gulliberg Jensen, Trondheim Vokalensemble & Trondheim Symphony Orchestra)
 Schoenberg, Adam: American Symphony; Finding Rothko; Picture Studies
Keith O. Johnson & Sean Royce Martin, engineers (Michael Stern & the Kansas City Symphony)
 Tyberg: Masses
John Newton, engineer; Jesse Brayman, mastering engineer (Brian A. Schmidt, Christopher Jacobson & South Dakota Chorale)

Producer
Producer of the Year, Non-Classical
 Greg Kurstin
 Concrete and Gold (Foo Fighters)
 "Dear Life" (Beck)
 "Dusk Till Dawn" (Zayn featuring Sia)
 "Love" (Kendrick Lamar featuring Zacari)
 "Strangers" (Halsey featuring Lauren Jauregui)
 "Wall of Glass" (Liam Gallagher)
 Calvin Harris
 "Don't Quit" (DJ Khaled & Calvin Harris featuring Travis Scott & Jeremih)
 Funk Wav Bounces Vol. 1 (Calvin Harris featuring Various Artists)
 Blake Mills
 Darkness and Light (John Legend)
 Eternally Even (Jim James)
 "God Only Knows" (John Legend & Cynthia Erivo featuring yMusic)
 Memories Are Now (Jesca Hoop)
 No Shape (Perfume Genius)
 Semper Femina (Laura Marling)
 No I.D.
 "America" (Logic featuring Black Thought, Chuck D, Big Lenbo & No I.D.)
 The Autobiography (Vic Mensa)
 4:44 (Jay-Z)
 The Stereotypes
 "Before I Do" (Sevyn Streeter)
 "Better" (Lil Yachty featuring Stefflon Don)
 "Deliver" (Fifth Harmony)
 "Finesse" (Bruno Mars)
 "Mo Bounce" (Iggy Azalea)
 "Sunshine" (Kyle featuring Miguel)
 "That's What I Like" (Bruno Mars)

Producer of the Year, Classical
 David Frost
Alma Española (Isabel Leonard)
Amplified Soul (Gabriela Martinez)
Beethoven: Piano Sonatas, Vol. 6 (Jonathan Biss)
Bruckner: Symphony No. 9 (Riccardo Muti and Chicago Symphony Orchestra)
Garden Of Joys And Sorrows (Hat Trick Trio)
Laks: Chamber Works (ARC Ensemble)
Adam Schoenberg: American Symphony; Finding Rothko; Picture Studies (Michael Stern and Kansas City Symphony)
Troika (Matt Haimovitz and Christopher O'Riley)
Verdi: Otello (Yannick Nézet-Séguin, Günther Groissböck, Željko Lučić, Dimitri Pittas, Aleksandrs Antoņenko, Sonya Yoncheva, Metropolitan Opera Orchestra and Chorus)
 Blanton Alspaugh
Adamo: Becoming Santa Claus (Emmanuel Villaume, Kevin Burdette, Keith Jameson, Lucy Schaufer, Hila Plitmann, Matt Boehler, Jonathan Blalock, Jennifer Rivera & Dallas Opera Orchestra)
Aldridge: Sister Carrie (William Boggs, Keith Phares, Matt Morgan, Alisa Suzanne Jordheim, Stephen Cunningham, Adriana Zabala, Florentine Opera Chorus & Milwaukee Symphony Orchestra)
Copland: Symphony No. 3; Three Latin American Sketches (Leonard Slatkin & Detroit Symphony Orchestra)
Death & The Maiden (Patricia Kopatchinskaja & The Saint Paul Chamber Orchestra)
Handel: Messiah (Andrew Davis, Noel Edison, Toronto Mendelssohn Choir & Toronto Symphony Orchestra)
Haydn: Symphonies Nos. 53, 64 & 96 (Carlos Kalmar & Oregon Symphony)
Heggie: It's A Wonderful Life (Patrick Summers, William Burden, Talise Trevigne, Andrea Carroll, Rod Gilfry & Houston Grand Opera)
Tyberg: Masses (Brian A. Schmidt, Christopher Jacobson & South Dakota Chorale)
 Manfred Eicher
Mansurian: Requiem (Alexander Liebreich, Florian Helgath, RIAS Kammerchor & Münchener Kammerorchester)
Monk, M.: On Behalf Of Nature (Meredith Monk & Vocal Ensemble)
Point & Line – Debussy And Hosokawa (Momo Kodama)
Rímur (Arve Henriksen & Trio Mediaeval)
Silvestrov: Hieroglyphen Der Nacht (Anja Lechner)
 Morten Lindberg
Furatus (Ole Edvard Antonsen & Wolfgang Plagge)
Interactions (Bård Monsen & Gunnar Flagstad)
Kleiberg: Mass For Modern Man (Eivind Gullberg Jensen, Trondheim Vokalensemble & Trondheim Symphony Orchestra)
Minor Major (Oslo String Quartet)
Northern Timbre (Ragnhild Hemsing & Tor Espen Aspaas)
So Is My Love (Nina T. Karlsen & Ensemble 96)
Thoresen: Sea Of Names (Trond Schau)
 Judith Sherman
American Nocturnes (Cecile Licad)
The Birthday Party (Aki Takahashi)
Discovering Bach (Michelle Ross)
Foss: Pieces Of Genius (New York New Music Ensemble)
Secret Alchemy – Chamber Works By Pierre Jalbert (Curtis Macomber & Michael Boriskin)
Sevenfive – The John Corigliano Effect (Gaudette Brass)
Sonic Migrations – Music Of Laurie Altman (Various Artists)
Tribute (Dover Quartet)
26 (Melia Watras & Michael Jinsoo Lim)

Remixer
Best Remixed Recording, Non-Classical
 "You Move" (Latroit Remix)
 Dennis White, remixer (Depeche Mode)
 "Can't Let You Go" (Louie Vega Roots Mix)
 Louie Vega, remixer (Loleatta Holloway)
 "Funk O'De Funk" (Smle Remix)
 Smle, remixer (Bobby Rush)
 "Undercover" (Adventure Club Remix)
 Leighton James & Christian Srigley, remixer (Kehlani)
 "A Violent Noise" (Four Tet Remix)
 Four Tet, remixer (The XX)

Surround Sound
Best Surround Sound Album
 Early Americans
 Jim Anderson, surround mix engineer; Darcy Proper, surround mastering engineer; Jim Anderson & Jane Ira Bloom, surround producers (Jane Ira Bloom)
 Kleiberg: Mass for Modern Man
 Morten Lindberg, surround mix engineer; Morten Lindberg, surround mastering engineer; Morten Lindberg, surround producer (Eivind Gullberg Jensen & Trondheim Symphony Orchestra and Choir)
 So Is My Love
 Morten Lindberg, surround mix engineer; Morten Lindberg, surround mastering engineer; Morten Lindberg, surround producer (Nina T. Karlsen & Ensemble 96)
 3-D The Catalogue
 Fritz Hilpert, surround mix engineer; Tom Ammermann, surround mastering engineer; Fritz Hilpert, surround producer (Kraftwerk)
 Tyberg: Masses
 Jesse Brayman, surround mix engineer; Jesse Brayman, surround mastering engineer; Blanton Alspaugh, surround producer (Brian A. Schmidt, Christopher Jacobson & South Dakota Chorale)

Classical
Best Orchestral Performance
 Shostakovich: Symphony No. 5; Barber: Adagio
Manfred Honeck, conductor (Pittsburgh Symphony Orchestra)
 Concertos for Orchestra
Louis Langrée, conductor (Cincinnati Symphony Orchestra)
 Copland: Symphony No. 3; Three Latin American Sketches
Leonard Slatkin, conductor (Detroit Symphony Orchestra)
 Debussy: Images; Jeux & La Plus Que Lente
Michael Tilson Thomas, conductor (San Francisco Symphony)
 Mahler: Symphony No. 5
Osmo Vänskä, conductor (Minnesota Orchestra)

Best Opera Recording
 Berg: Wozzeck
Hans Graf, conductor; Anne Schwanewilms & Roman Trekel, soloists; Hans Graf, producer (Houston Symphony; Chorus Of Students And Alumni, Shepherd School of Music, Rice University & Houston Grand Opera Children's Chorus)
 Berg: Lulu
Lothar Koenigs, conductor; Daniel Brenna, Marlis Petersen & Johan Reuter, soloists; Jay David Saks, producer (Metropolitan Opera Orchestra)
 Bizet: Les Pêcheurs De Perles
Gianandrea Noseda, conductor; Diana Damrau, Mariusz Kwiecień, Matthew Polenzani & Nicolas Testé, soloists; Jay David Saks, producer (Metropolitan Opera Orchestra and Chorus)
 Händel: Ottone
George Petrou, conductor; Max Emanuel Cencic & Lauren Snouffer, soloists; Jacob Händel, producer (Il Pomo D'Oro)
 Rimsky-Korsakov: The Golden Cockerel
Valery Gergiev, conductor; Vladimir Feliauer, Aida Garifullina & Kira Loginova, soloists; Ilya Petrov, producer (Mariinsky Orchestra; Mariinsky Chorus)

Best Choral Performance
 Bryars: The Fifth Century
Donald Nally, conductor; The Crossing, choir (PRISM, ensemble)
 Händel: Messiah
Andrew Davis, conductor; Noel Edison, chorus master; Toronto Mendelssohn Choir (Elizabeth DeShong, John Relyea, Andrew Staples & Erin Wall, soloists; Toronto Symphony Orchestra)
 Mansurian: Requiem
Alexander Liebreich, conductor; Florian Helgath, chorus master; RIAS Kammerchor (Anja Petersen & Andrew Redmond, soloists; Münchener Kammerorchester)
 Music of the Spheres
Nigel Short, conductor; Tenebrae (choir)
 Tyberg: Masses
Brian A. Schmidt, conductor; South Dakota Chorale (Christopher Jacobson, soloist)

Best Chamber Music/Small Ensemble Performance
 Death & the Maiden
Patricia Kopatchinskaja & the Saint Paul Chamber Orchestra
 Buxtehude: Trio Sonatas Op. 1
Arcangelo
 Divine Theatre – Sacred Motets by Giaches de Wert
Stile Antico
 Franck, Kurtág, Previn & Schumann
Joyce Yang & Augustin Hadelich
 Martha Argerich & Friends – Live From Lugano 2016
Martha Argerich & Various Artists

Best Classical Instrumental Solo
 Transcendal
 Daniil Trifonov
 Bach: The French Suites
 Murray Perahia
 Haydn: Cello Concertos
 Steven Isserlis; Florian Donderer, conductor (The Deutsche Kammerphilharmonie Bremen)
 Levina: The Piano Concertos
 Maria Lettberg; Ariane Matiakh, conductor (Rundfunk-Sinfonieorchester Berlin)
 Shostakovich: Violin Concertos Nos. 1 & 2
 Frank Peter Zimmermann; Alan Gilbert, conductor (NDR Elbphilharmonie Orchester)

Best Classical Solo Vocal Album
 Crazy Girl Crazy – Music by Gershwin, Berg & Berio
Barbara Hannigan
 Bach & Telemann: Sacred Cantatas
Philippe Jaroussky, soloist; Petra Müllejans, conductor
 Gods & Monsters
Nicholas Phan, soloist; Myra Huang, accompanist
 In War & Peace – Harmony Through Music
Joyce DiDonato, soloist; Maxim Emelyanychev, conductor
 Sviridov: Russia Cast Adrift
Dmitri Hvorostovsky, soloist; Constantine Orbelian, conductor

Best Classical Compendium
 Higdon: All Things Majestic, Viola Concerto & Oboe Concerto
 Giancarlo Guerrero, conductor; Tim Handley, producer
 Barbara
 Alexandre Tharaud, conductor; Cécile Lenoir, producer
 Kurtág: Complete Works for Ensemble & Choir
 Reinbert de Leeuw, conductor; Guido Tichelman, producer
 Les Routes de l'Esclavage
 Jordi Savall, conductor; Benjamin Bletton, producer
 Mademoiselle: Première Audience – Unknown Music of Nadia Boulanger
 Lucy Mauro, pianist and producer

Best Contemporary Classical Composition
 Viola Concerto
Jennifer Higdon, composer (Roberto Diaz, Giancarlo Geurrero & the Nashville Symphony)
 Songs of Solitude
Richard Danielpour, composer (Thomas Hampson, Giancarlo Guerrero & the Nashville Symphony)
 Requiem
Tigran Mansurian, composer (Alexander Liebreich, Florian Helgath, the RIAS Kammerchor & the Münchener Kammerorchester)
 Picture Studies
Adam Schoenberg, composer (Michael Stern & the Kansas City Symphony)
 Concerto for Orchestra
Zhou Tian, composer (Louis Langrée & the Cincinnati Symphony Orchestra)

Music Video/Film
Best Music Video
 "Humble" – Kendrick Lamar
 The Little Homies & Dave Meyers, video directors; Jason Baum, Dave Free, Jamie Rabineau, Nathan K. Scherrer & Anthony Tiffith, video producers
 "Up All Night" – Beck
 Canada, video director; Alba Barneda, Laura Serra Estorch & Oscar Romagosa, video producers
 "Makeba" – Jain
 Lionel Hirle & Gregory Ohrel, video directors; Yodelice, video producer
 "The Story of O.J." – Jay-Z
 Shawn Carter & Mark Romanek, video directors; Daniel Midgley, Elizabeth Newman & Chaka Pilgrim, video producers
 "1-800-273-8255" – Logic featuring Alessia Cara & Khalid
 Andy Hines, video director; Brandon Bonfiglio, Mildred Delamota, Andrew Lerios, Luga Podesta & Alex Randal, video producers

Best Music Film
 The Defiant Ones – (various artists) Allen Hughes, video director; Sarah Anthony, Fritzi Horstman, Broderick Johnson, Gene Kirkwood, Andrew Kosove, Laura Lancaster, Michael Lombardo, Jerry Longarzo, Doug Pray & Steven Williams, video producers'''
 One More Time With Feeling – Nick Cave & The Bad Seeds
 Andrew Dominik, video director; Dulcie Kellett & James Wilson, video producers
 Long Strange Trip – The Grateful Dead
 Amir Bar-Lev, video director; Alex Blavatnik, Ken Dornstein, Eric Eisner, Nick Koskoff, Justin Kreutzmann, video producers
 Soundbreaking – (various artists)
 Maro Chermayeff & Jeff Dupre, video directors; Joshua Bennett, Julia Marchesi, Sam Pollard, Sally Rosenthal, Amy Schewel & Warren Zanes, video producers
 Two Trains Runnin – (various artists)
 Sam Pollard, video director; Benjamin Hedin, video producer

Special Merit Awards
MusiCares Person of the Year
 Fleetwood Mac
 Mick Fleetwood
 John McVie
 Christine McVie
 Lindsey Buckingham
 Stevie Nicks

Lifetime Achievement Award
 Hal Blaine
 Neil Diamond
 Emmylou Harris
 Louis Jordan
 The Meters
 Queen
 Tina Turner

Trustees Award
 Bill Graham
 Seymour Stein
 John Williams

Technical Grammy Award
 Tony Agnello
 Richard Factor

Music Educator Award
 2014 Kent Knappenberger (Westfield Academy and Central School in Westfield, N.Y.)
 2015 Jared Cassedy (of Windham High School in Windham, N.H.)
 2016 Phillip Riggs (of North Carolina School of Science and Mathematics in Durham, N.C)
 2017 Keith Hancock (of Tesoro High School in Rancho Santa Margarita, C.A.)

 2018 Melissa Salguero (of P.S. 48 Joseph R. Drake in Hunts Point, Bronx)
 2019 Jeffery Redding (of West Orange High School in Florida
 2020 Mickey Smith Jr. (of Maplewood Middle School in Sulphur, Louisiana)
 2021 Jeffrey Murdock (of The University of Arkansas)
 2022 Stephen Cox (of Eastland High School in Eastland, Texas)

Grammy Hall of Fame inductions

In Memoriam

Tom Petty
Walter Becker
J Geils
Eddie Clarke
Pat DiNizio
Gord Downie
Ray Thomas
Johnny Hallyday
Cuba Gooding Sr.
Charles Bradley
Denise LaSalle
Dolores O'Riordan
Chuck Berry
David Cassidy
Glen Campbell
Troy Gentry
Jo Walker-Meador
Bill Hearn
Fats Domino
Keely Smith
Sylvia Moy
Bunny Sigler
Wayne Cochran
Leon Ware
Gregg Allman
Lonnie Brooks
James Cotton
Clyde Stubblefield
Rick Hall
Jimmy Beaumont
Gary Arnold
 Jay Lowy
Paul Buckmaster
Joni Sledge
Don Williams
Mel Tillis
Jon Hendricks
Hugh Masekela
Larry Coryell
John Abercrombie
Grady Tate
Allan Holdsworth
Ralph Carney
George Avakian
Tommy LiPuma
Roberta Peters
Robert Mann
Jerry Lewis
Jim Nabors
Shelley Berman
Prodigy
Lil Peep
Reggie Osse
Chris Cornell
Malcolm Young
Bruce Hampton
Bruce Langhorne
Ed Greene
 Jordan Feldstein
Sandy Gallin
Carol Peters
 Joseph Rascoff
 Harry Sandler
Edwin Hawkins
Della Reese
Thomas Meehan
Dave Valentin
Jerry Perenchio
Jerry Ross
Tom Coyne
Nigel Grainge
Chester Bennington

Multiple nominations and awards
The following received multiple nominations:Eight:Jay-ZSeven:Kendrick LamarSix:Bruno MarsFive:Childish Gambino
Khalid
No I.D.
SZAFour:Christopher Brody Brown
Alessia Cara
Serban Ghenea
John Hanes
Justin Hurwitz
Philip Lawrence
Morten LindbergThree:Justin Bieber
Tom Coyne
Daddy Yankee
James Fauntleroy
Luis Fonsi
Ludwig Goransson
Dave Kutch
Ledisi
Charles Moniz
Nothing More
Chuck Owen
Chris Stapleton
The Stereotypes
Pharrell WilliamsTwo:Derek "MixedByAli" Ali
Gregg Allman
Blanton Alspaugh
Jack Antonoff
The Baylor Project
John Beasley
6lack
Bonobo
Mike Bozzi
Jesse Brayman
Tim Breen
Daniel Caesar
Warryn Campbell
Cardi B
Billy Childs
Anat Cohen
Leonard Cohen
Coldplay
Michael Corcoran
JT Daly
Jimmy Douglass
Foo Fighters
Gorillaz
Michael Graves
Bernie Grundman
Fred Hersch
James Hetfield
Fritz Hilpert
Asheton Hogan
James Hunt
Sam Hunt
Imagine Dragons
Jason Isbell and the 400 Unit
Gimel "Young Guru" Keaton
Kesha
K.Flay
Martin Kistner
Alison Krauss
Greg Kurstin
Lady Antebellum
Lady Gaga
Ladysmith Black Mambazo
Miranda Lambert
LCD Soundsystem
Le'Andria
Lil Uzi Vert
Little Big Town
Logic
Riley Mackin
Raul Malo
Mura Masa
Mastodon
Shane McAnally
Vince Mendoza
MercyMe
Andreas K. Meyer
Julia Michaels
Midland
Migos
Mike Will Made It
Lin-Manuel Miranda
Father John Misty
Odesza
Josh Osborne
Pasek and Paul
Sam Pollard
Chris Potter
Rapsody
Ruben Rivera
Robert Russ
Jay David Saks
Matt Schaeffer
Ed Sheeran
Ken Shipley
Nate Smith
Taylor Swift
Andrew Taggart
Anthony Tiffith
Lars Ulrich
Tauren Wells
CeCe Winans
Hans Zimmer

The following received multiple awards:Six:Bruno MarsFive:Kendrick LamarThree:Christopher Brody Brown
Tom Coyne
James Fauntleroy
Serban Ghenea
John Hanes
Philip Lawrence
Charles Moniz
Chris StapletonTwo:''
Justin Hurwitz
Jason Isbell
Ray Charles McCullough II
Jeremy Reeves
Ray Romulus
Shampoo Press & Curl
Ed Sheeran
CeCe Winans
Johnathan Yip

Changes
In June 2017, the Grammy organization announced a few minor changes to the voting and awarding process.

 As of 2018, voting members will cast their votes online rather than by paper ballot. This transition will provide greater flexibility for touring artists, eliminate the possibility of invalid ballots, and protect further against fraudulent voting.
 All music creators, including songwriters, producers, engineers, mixers, mastering engineers and featured artists, which are credited with at least 33 percent or more playing time on the winning album will be eligible to receive a Grammy in the Album of the Year category. This is the first time songwriters are recognized in this category.
 From this year on, Nominations Review Committees will be created and implemented for the Rap, Contemporary Instrumental, and New Age Fields.
 From this year, the definition of Album is expanded in Classical, Dance, And Jazz Fields. To be eligible for Grammy consideration, an album must comprise a minimum total playing time of 15 minutes with at least five distinct tracks or a minimum total playing time of 30 minutes with no minimum track requirement.
 An exception on the rule of only one version of a song allowed to enter in the Grammy Awards nomination process will be made in the Best Song Written for Visual Media category, allowing the film version of a track to be entered in the category, even if a different version of the track is submitted in other categories. In the Best Compilation Soundtrack for Visual Media category, eligibility guidelines have been amended to require soundtrack albums for a documentary or biopic to contain 51 percent or more of newly recorded music.

New York as a host city
The 60th Annual Grammy Awards marked the first time since 2003 that the ceremony was held in New York City. The Staples Center in Los Angeles had been the home of the Grammys since 2000. The 2003 ceremony was also held at New York City's Madison Square Garden. The fifteen-year gap between the 2003 and 2018 Grammys in New York marked the longest period of time New York went without hosting the awards.

With the main telecast being held at Madison Square Garden, the premiere ceremony (also known as the Pre-Telecast) was held at the Hulu Theater.

The MusiCares Person of the Year tribute is typically held at the Los Angeles Convention Center two days prior to the Grammys, but since the 2018 Grammy Awards were held in New York, the MusiCares tribute was held at Radio City Music Hall.

Controversy and cost overruns
Hosting the Grammy Awards in New York City resulted in the Grammy Awards costing more to organize, as the costs associated with hosting it in Los Angeles are significantly less. The awards cost $8 million more to host in New York City. The host committee that the city assembled failed to raise the money that they had initially promised. The MusiCares Person of the Year tribute, which the Barclays Center (operated by AEG) was hoping to host, ended up being held at Radio City Music Hall, which is owned by The Madison Square Garden Company. MusiCares funds, which were intended for charitable purposes, were instead used to pay for the $8 million cost overruns associated with hosting the Grammys in New York City.

Dana Tomarken, the former executive VP of MusiCares, claims that Recording Academy president Neil Portnow directed these funds away from MusiCares to pay for the cost overruns. Dana Tomarken had been negotiating a deal to have the MusiCares Person of the Year tribute to Fleetwood Mac to be held at the Barclays Center, but Portnow decided to have it at Radio City Music Hall, without consulting Tomarken. Irving Azoff who heads Azoff MSG Entertainment (which is affiliated with The Madison Square Garden Company), informed her of this change rather than Portnow consulting her first. Tomarken has since made a claim of wrongful termination. On June 5, 2018, an independent investigation was launched to examine the claims made by Dana Tomarken. The investigation also examined the MusiCares Person of the Year tribute as well as sexual harassment allegations. In May 2019, Tomarken claimed she was fired because she pushed back against the academy's "boys club". The academy allegedly tried to keep Tomarken's allegations from being fully made public. She also claimed that she struggled to find a suitable venue in New York for the MusiCares Person of the Year tribute to Fleetwood Mac. The Barclays Center offered up an acceptable deal, but Irving Azoff of the Madison Square Garden Company prevented the event from being held there. By having it at Radio City instead, the event was not a traditional VIP dinner, nor did it have a silent auction. This then prevented the event from turning a profit.

On June 4, 2018, the mayor's office weighed in on the controversy, saying their position was always to be "venue neutral" and denied any involvement in the venue controversy. The Barclays Center notified City Hall of their interest in being involved with Grammy week, and Julie Menin (the New York City Commissioner for the Mayor's Office of Media and Entertainment) passed that information along to Grammy organizers.

Ratings

The show was moved to January to avoid competing with the 2018 Winter Olympics in Pyeongchang, as was the case in 2010 and 2014. Viewership for the ceremony dropped 24% compared to the previous year, obtaining the smallest audience in the show's history in the key demographic.

References

 060
2018 in American music
2018 in New York City
2018 music awards
2010s in Manhattan
Madison Square Garden
January 2018 events in the United States